The two-scaled gecko (Ancylodactylus dilepis) is a species of gecko endemic to Cameroon.

References

Endemic fauna of Cameroon
dilepis
Reptiles described in 1963